The Greek word "ἐλευθερία" (capitalized Ἐλευθερία;), transliterated as eleutheria, is an Ancient Greek term for, and personification of, liberty. Eleutheria personified had a brief career on coins of Alexandria.

In Ancient Greece, Eleutheria was also an epithet for the goddess Artemis, and as such she was worshipped in Myra of Lycia.  The Roman equivalent of the goddess Eleutheria is Libertas, a goddess in her own right, and a personification of liberty.

Etymology
For R. F. Willets, Cretan dialect 'Eleuthia' would connect Eileithyia (or perhaps the goddess "Eleutheria") to Eleusis. The name is probably related with a  city in Crete named Eleutherna.
Walter Burkert believes that Eileithyia is the Greek goddess of birth and that her name is pure-Greek.  However the relation with the Greek prefix  is uncertain, because the prefix appears in some Pre-Greek toponyms like  (Eleutherna).

Hyginus describes Eleutheria as a daughter of Zeus and Hera.

In Roman mythology, Demeter (Ceres) has a daughter named Libera ("Liberty/Freedom").

Modern interpretations
I. F. Stone, who taught himself Greek in his old age, wrote a book, The Trial of Socrates, pointing out that Socrates and Plato do not value eleutheria, freedom; instead were Sparta-lovers, wanting a monarch, an oligarchy, instead of a democracy, a republic.

The French philosopher Michel Foucault, in lectures given at Berkeley and Boulder, made the same argument for Socrates' failure to invoke parrhesia, freedom of speech, the obligation to speak the truth for the common good at personal risk, in his own defense at his trial, preferring to die in obedience to law as above men. Athenians held that they democratically shaped law, seeing Socrates' stance as treason.

References

Society of ancient Greece
Greek goddesses
Children of Zeus
Children of Hera
Personifications in Greek mythology
Epithets of Artemis